= David Monagan =

American journalist

David Monagan is an American journalist and author. He has been based in Cork, Ireland since 2000.

== Books ==
- Jaywalking with the Irish (Lonely Planet, 2004)
- Ireland Unhinged (Council Oak Books and Random House, 2011)
- with David O. Williams Journey into the Heart: A Tale of Pioneering Doctors and Their Race to Transform Cardiovascular Medicine (Gotham)
